Omphalophana is a genus of moths of the family Noctuidae.

Species
 Omphalophana anatolica Lederer, 1857
 Omphalophana antirrhinii Hübner, 1803
 Omphalophana durnalayana Osthelder, 1933
 Omphalophana pauli (Staudinger, 1892)
 Omphalophana serrata Treitschke, 1835
 Omphalophana serrulata L.Ronkay & Gyulai, 2006

References
 Natural History Museum Lepidoptera genus database
 Omphalophana at funet.fi
 Ronkay, L. & Gyulai, P. (2006). "New Noctuidae (Lepidoptera) species from Iran and Tibet." Esperiana Buchreihe zur Entomologie 12: 211-241.

Cuculliinae